Paul Jozef Crutzen (3 December 1933 – 28 January 2021) was a Dutch meteorologist and atmospheric chemist. He was awarded the Nobel Prize in Chemistry in 1995 for his work on atmospheric chemistry and specifically for his efforts in studying the formation and decomposition of atmospheric ozone. In addition to studying the ozone layer and climate change, he popularized the term Anthropocene to describe a proposed new epoch in the Quaternary period when human actions have a drastic effect on the Earth. He was also amongst the first few scientists to introduce the idea of a nuclear winter to describe the potential climatic effects stemming from large-scale atmospheric pollution including smoke from forest fires, industrial exhausts, and other sources like oil fires.

He was a member of the Royal Swedish Academy of Sciences and an elected foreign member of the Royal Society in the United Kingdom.

Early life and education
Crutzen was born in Amsterdam, the son of Anna (Gurk) and Josef Crutzen. In September 1940, the same year Germany invaded The Netherlands, Crutzen entered his first year of elementary school. After many delays and school switches caused by events in the war, Crutzen graduated from elementary school and moved onto "Hogere Burgerschool" (Higher Citizens School) in 1946, where he became fluent in French, English, and German. Along with languages he also focused on natural sciences in this school, from which he graduated in 1951. After this he studied Civil Engineering at a technical school, completed his military service, and married. In 1958, he moved his young family to Gävle.

Research and career
Crutzen conducted research primarily in atmospheric chemistry. He is best known for his research on ozone depletion. In 1970 he pointed out that emissions of nitrous oxide, a stable, long-lived gas produced by soil bacteria, from the Earth's surface could affect the amount of nitric oxide (NO) in the stratosphere. Crutzen showed that nitrous oxide lives long enough to reach the stratosphere, where it is converted into NO. Crutzen then noted that increasing use of fertilizers might have led to an increase in nitrous oxide emissions over the natural background, which would in turn result in an increase in the amount of NO in the stratosphere. Thus human activity could affect the stratospheric ozone layer. In the following year, Crutzen and (independently) Harold Johnston suggested that NO emissions from the fleet of, then proposed, supersonic transport (SST) airliners (a few hundred Boeing 2707s), which would fly in the lower stratosphere, could also deplete the ozone layer; however more recent analysis has disputed this as a large concern.

He listed his main research interests as "Stratospheric and tropospheric chemistry, and their role in the biogeochemical cycles and climate". From 1980, he worked at the Department of Atmospheric Chemistry at the Max Planck Institute for Chemistry, in Mainz, Germany; the Scripps Institution of Oceanography at the University of California, San Diego; and at Seoul National University, South Korea. He was also a long-time adjunct professor at Georgia Institute of Technology and research professor at the department of meteorology at Stockholm University, Sweden. From 1997 to 2002 he was professor of aeronomy at the Department of Physics and Astronomy at Utrecht University.

He co-signed a letter from over 70 Nobel laureate scientists to the Louisiana Legislature supporting the repeal of that U.S. state's creationism law, the Louisiana Science Education Act. In 2003 he was one of 22 Nobel laureates who signed the Humanist Manifesto.

, Crutzen has an h-index of 151 according to Google Scholar and of 110 according to Scopus.

Anthropocene 

One of Crutzen's research interests was the Anthropocene. In 2000, in IGBP Newsletter 41, Crutzen and Eugene F. Stoermer, to emphasize the central role of mankind in geology and ecology, proposed using the term anthropocene for the current geological epoch. In regard to its start, they said:

To assign a more specific date to the onset of the "anthropocene" seems somewhat arbitrary, but we propose the latter part of the 18th century, although we are aware that alternative proposals can be made (some may even want to include the entire holocene). However, we choose this date because, during the past two centuries, the global effects of human activities have become clearly noticeable. This is the period when data retrieved from glacial ice cores show the beginning of a growth in the atmospheric concentrations of several "greenhouse gases", in particular CO2 and CH4. Such a starting date also coincides with James Watt's invention of the steam engine in 1784.

Geoengineering (Climate intervention)
Steve Connor, Science Editor of The Independent, wrote that Crutzen believes that political attempts to limit man-made greenhouse gases are so pitiful that a radical contingency plan is needed. In a polemical scientific essay that was published in the August 2006 issue of the journal Climatic Change, he says that an "escape route" is needed if global warming begins to run out of control.

Crutzen advocated for climate engineering solutions, including artificially cooling the global climate by releasing particles of sulphur in the upper atmosphere, along with other particles at lower atmospheric levels, which would reflect sunlight and heat back into space. If this artificial cooling method actually were to work, it would reduce some of the effects of the accumulation of green house gas emissions caused by human activity, potentially extending the planet's integrity and livability.

In January 2008, Crutzen published findings that the release of nitrous oxide emissions in the production of biofuels means that they contribute more to global warming than the fossil fuels they replace.

Nuclear winter 
Crutzen was also a leader in promoting the theory of nuclear winter. Together with John W. Birks he wrote the first publication introducing the subject: The atmosphere after a nuclear war: Twilight at noon (1982). They theorized the potential climatic effects of the large amounts of sooty smoke from fires in the forests and in urban and industrial centers and oil storage facilities, which would reach the middle and higher troposphere. They concluded that absorption of sunlight by the black smoke could lead to darkness and strong cooling at the earth's surface, and a heating of the atmosphere at higher elevations, thus creating atypical meteorological and climatic conditions which would jeopardize agricultural production for a large part of the human population.

In a Baltimore Sun newspaper article printed in January 1991, along with his nuclear winter colleagues, Crutzen hypothesized that the climatic effects of the Kuwait oil fires would result in "significant" nuclear winter-like effects; continental-sized effects of sub-freezing temperatures.

Awards and honours
Crutzen, Mario J. Molina, and F. Sherwood Rowland were awarded the Nobel Prize in Chemistry in 1995 "for their work in atmospheric chemistry, particularly concerning the formation and decomposition of ozone". Some of Crutzen's others honours include the below: 

 1976: Outstanding Publication Award, Environmental Research Laboratories, National Oceanic and Atmospheric Administration
 1984: Rolex-Discover Scientist of the Year.
 1985: Recipient of the Leó Szilárd Award for "Physics in the Publics Interest" of the American Physical Society.
 1986: Elected as a Fellow of the American Geophysical Union.
 1989: Tyler Prize for Environmental Achievement.
 1990: Corresponding Member of the Royal Netherlands Academy of Arts and Sciences
 1995: Recipient of the Global Ozone Award for "Outstanding Contribution for the Protection of the Ozone Layer" by United Nations Environment Programme.
 1999: Foreign Member of the Russian Academy of Sciences.
 2006: Elected a Foreign Member of the Royal Society (ForMemRS)
2007: International Member of the American Philosophical Society
 2017: Honorary Member of the Royal Netherlands Chemical Society
 2019: Lomonosov Gold Medal

Personal life
In 1956 Crutzen met Terttu Soininen, whom he married a few years later in February 1958. In December of the same year, the couple had a daughter by the name of Ilona. In March 1964, the couple had another daughter, Sylvia.

Crutzen died aged 87 on 28 January 2021.

References

External links 
  including the Nobel Lecture, 8 December 1995 My Life with O3, NOx and Other YZOxs 

 
 Memoirs Paul Jozef Crutzen. 3 December 1933—28 January 2021 auf The Royal Society Publishing (englisch)

1933 births
2021 deaths
20th-century Dutch chemists
Dutch climatologists
Atmospheric chemists

Dutch Nobel laureates
Nobel laureates in Chemistry
Sustainability advocates
Scientists from Amsterdam

Georgia Tech faculty
Academic staff of Johannes Gutenberg University Mainz
Max Planck Society people
Stockholm University alumni
Academic staff of Utrecht University

Commanders of the Order of the Netherlands Lion
Fellows of the American Geophysical Union
Foreign Members of the Royal Society
Foreign Members of the Russian Academy of Sciences
Foreign associates of the National Academy of Sciences
Members of the Pontifical Academy of Sciences
Members of the Royal Netherlands Academy of Arts and Sciences
Members of the Royal Swedish Academy of Sciences
Members of the Royal Swedish Academy of Engineering Sciences
Members of the German Academy of Sciences Leopoldina
Members of the American Philosophical Society
Knights Commander of the Order of Merit of the Federal Republic of Germany
21st-century Dutch chemists
Max Planck Institute directors